Valentīns Lobaņovs (born 23 October 1971 in Riga) is a former football midfielder from Latvia. He has played 58 international matches and scored 1 goal for the Latvia national team. He debuted in 1994, and played at the Euro 2004. He started his career in Skonto FC and later played for Metallurg Lipetsk, Metallurg Krasnoyarsk, Shinnik Yaroslavl, Metalurh Zaporizhzhia, FK Venta. His last club was FK Jūrmala.

Honours
Skonto
Latvian Higher League champion: 1992, 1993, 1994, 1995, 1996, 2000, 2001, 2003
Latvian Football Cup winner: 1992, 1995, 1998, 2000, 2001

External links
 Voetbal International
Latvian Football Federation (in Latvian)

1971 births
Living people
Soviet footballers
FK Liepājas Metalurgs players
Latvian footballers
Skonto FC players
FC Metallurg Lipetsk players
Latvian expatriate footballers
Expatriate footballers in Russia
Latvian expatriate sportspeople in Russia
FC Shinnik Yaroslavl players
Russian Premier League players
FC Yenisey Krasnoyarsk players
FC Metalurh Zaporizhzhia players
Ukrainian Premier League players
Expatriate footballers in Ukraine
Latvian expatriate sportspeople in Ukraine
FK Daugava (2003) players
Latvia international footballers
UEFA Euro 2004 players
Latvian people of Russian descent
FK Venta players
Association football midfielders